Polygala ambigua is a species of flowering plant in the milkwort family (Polygalaceae). It was first described in 1818 and is native to the United States and Japan.

References

ambigua